Ken Eyre (11 November 1941 – 5 September 2018) was a professional rugby league footballer who played in the 1950s, 1960s and 1970s. As a child Ken represented Bewerly Street school, Hunslet Schools' R.L. and Yorkshire Schools R.L.

Playing career

International honours
Ken Eyre won a cap for Great Britain while at Hunslet in 1965 against New Zealand.

County honours
Ken Eyre represented Yorkshire while at Hunslet against New Zealand at Castleford in 1965, against Lancashire at Swinton in 1965, and against Cumberland at Headingley Rugby Stadium, Leeds in 1965.

Challenge Cup Final appearances
Ken Eyre played right-, i.e. number 10, in Hunslet's 16–20 defeat by Wigan in the 1965 Challenge Cup  Final  at Wembley Stadium, London on Saturday 8 May 1965, in front of a crowd of 89,016, and played right- in Leeds' 11–10 victory over Wakefield Trinity in the 1968 Challenge Cup "Watersplash" Final Wembley on Saturday 11 May 1968, in front of a crowd of 87,100.

Championship final appearances
Ken Eyre played in Hunslet's 22–44 defeat by St. Helens in the Rugby Football League Championship Final during the 1958–59 season at Odsal Stadium, Bradford, and played in Leeds' 16–14 victory over Castleford in the Rugby Football League Championship Final during the 1968–69 season at Odsal Stadium on Saturday 24 May 1969.

County Cup Final appearances
Ken Eyre played right- in Hunslet's 12–2 victory over Hull Kingston Rovers in the 1962 Yorkshire Cup Final at Headingley Rugby Stadium, Leeds on Saturday 27 October 1962, and in the 8–17 defeat by Bradford Northern in the 1965 Yorkshire Cup Final during the 1965–66 season at Headingley on Saturday 16 October 1965, and played right-, in Leeds' 11–10 victory over Castleford in the 1968 Yorkshire Cup Final during the 1968–69 season at Belle Vue, Wakefield on Saturday 19 October 1968.

Club career
Ken Eyre made his début for Hunslet in the season 1958-59, he was transferred from Hunslet to Leeds in September 1966 for a fee of £5,950  He broke his arm 4 times in his opening season at Leeds.

Family
Ken Eyre's marriage to Betty (née Musgrave) took place during third ¼ 1962 in Leeds District. They had two children; Maxine Eyre, and Steven Rhys Eyre (birth registered in third ¼  in Leeds district), and two grandchildren; Rebecca and Caitlin Lauren. Ken Eyre was the older brother of the rugby league  who played in the 1960s for Leeds and Keighley; Albert Eyre (born ).

References

External links
Rugby Cup Final 1968

1941 births
Great Britain national rugby league team players
Hunslet R.L.F.C. players
Leeds Rhinos players
2018 deaths
Place of birth missing
Rugby league props